Heung Shing is a fictional city appearing in examinations (such as Hong Kong Certificate of Education Examination, Hong Kong Advanced Level Examination and Hong Kong Diploma of Secondary Education Examination) of Hong Kong Examinations and Assessment Authority. That city often portrays Hong Kong. However, it is unclear that whether there are any relations between portrayals between each year's exam paper.

History
Historians found that human activity in Heung Shing dates back over five millennia, as some Neolithic tombs were found in Pak Shue Tan (白樹灘) in 2001.

Geography
Heung Shing is near to the Nam Kong (南江), Shen Shing (新城) and Sha Chau (沙洲). Nam Kong has organized a book fair in 2005, which made number of people entering the Heung Shing Book Fair decrease for 40,000.

See also
Hong Kong Examinations and Assessment Authority
Hong Kong Certificate of Education Examination
Hong Kong Advanced Level Examination

References
 

School examinations in Hong Kong
Fictional populated places